Showers is a surname. Notable people with the name include:

 Derek Showers (born 1953), Welsh footballer
 Edward Maclean Showers (died 1925), British soldier, police officer, and Chief Constable
 Jameill Showers (born 1991), American football quarterback
 Jan Showers, American interior designer
 John Showers (born 1952), American politician from Pennsylvania
 Mel Showers, American journalist and news presenter
 Michael Showers (born 1945), English convicted drug dealer
 Michael Showers (actor) (1966–2011), American actor
 Reggie Showers (born 1964), American drag racer
 Shea Showers (born 1974), American football player

See also
 Shower (surname)